Neusticomys is a genus of semiaquatic, animalivorous South American rodents in the family Cricetidae.

N. monticolous and N. vossi primarily inhabit montante regions of west Columbia and eastern Ecuador, with the former noted to occur in the Andean Cordillera and the Occidental mountain range at elevations of 1,800-3,750 meters. The rest inhabit tropical lowland forests primarily in the northern and eastern regions of the Amazon rainforest, whereas N. peruviensis is an endemic species to Peru.

This genus contains the following seven species:
 Ferreira's fish-eating rat (Neusticomys ferreirai) — Percequillo, Carmignotto & Silva, 2005 
 Montane fish-eating rat (N. monticolus) — Anthony, 1921
 Musso's fish-eating rat (N. mussoi) — Ochoa G. & Soriano, 1991
 Oyapock's fish-eating rat (N. oyapocki) — (Dubost & Petter, 1978)
 Peruvian fish-eating rat (N. peruviensis) — (Musser & Gardner, 1974)
 Venezuelan fish-eating rat (N. venezuelae) — (Anthony, 1929)
 Voss' fish-eating rat (N. vossi) — (Hanson, D’Elía, Ayers, Cox, Burneo & Lee, 2015)

Distribution

References

 
Rodent genera
Taxonomy articles created by Polbot